Adaptor protein may refer to:
Signal transducing adaptor protein
Vesicular transport adaptor protein
Clathrin adaptor protein, also known as adaptin